Samuel Williams Haughton (1738–1793) was the speaker of the House of Assembly of Jamaica from 1778 to 1793.

He was a slave-owner and the owner of the Orange Cove Estate and the Unity plantation in Hanover Parish, Jamaica.

See also
 List of speakers of the House of Assembly of Jamaica

References

Further reading
 "Hawtayne" [Haughton], Caribbeana, Vol. VI, Part 1.

Speakers of the House of Assembly of Jamaica
18th-century Jamaican people
1738 births
1793 deaths
Hanover Parish